Corey Holland (born January 1, 1970) is an American politician who served in the Oklahoma House of Representatives from the 51st district from 2008 to 2012.

References

1970 births
Living people
Republican Party members of the Oklahoma House of Representatives